Trieste Kelly Dunn (born January 14, 1981) is an American actress.  She is known for her role as Deputy Siobhan Kelly in the Cinemax series Banshee and  U.S. Marshal Allison Knight in the NBC series Blindspot.

Personal life
Dunn studied theater at the North Carolina School of the Arts, where she appeared in a number of student films, including those made by classmates and future collaborators Zach Clark, Brett Haley, Aaron Katz, and Brendan McFadden.

In 2010, Filmmaker Magazine named her one of the 25 New Faces of Independent in their Summer Issue, and the Los Angeles Times touted her as a "break out star" based on her roles in the independent films Cold  Weather and The New Year.

Career
Dunn first rose to prominence on the FOX TV series Canterbury's Law as Molly McConnell opposite Julianna Margulies. Her early film roles  included critically lauded turns in United 93 (2006), Cold Weather (2010) and Vacation! (2010). She has also appeared on Fringe as Valerie Boone, the victim of a scientific experiment in the episode "Midnight", and also guest starred on HBO's Bored to Death. In 2014, she portrayed FBI Agent Elizabeth Ferrell on the TV series Believe concurrently with her co-starring role as Dep. Siobhan Kelly in Banshee.  In late 2015, Dunn began a recurring role as U.S. Marshal Allison Knight, on the NBC drama Blindspot.  In 2015, she played Natalie, a recurring character in the single season of Almost There, on Audience.  Dunn has also appeared in guest roles on episodes of a number of other television series. 

She portrayed an android in the music video for "Propagation", the single off Com Truise's 2017 album Iteration.

Filmography

Film

Television

References

External links

1981 births
Actresses from Utah
American film actresses
American television actresses
Living people
People from Provo, Utah
University of North Carolina School of the Arts alumni
21st-century American actresses